The Girl on a Swing is a 1926 German silent film directed by Felix Basch and starring Ossi Oswalda, Harry Liedtke, and Lotte Lorring.

The film's art direction was by Julius von Borsody.

Cast
Ossi Oswalda
Harry Liedtke
Lotte Lorring
Olga Engl
Harry Bender
Albert Paulig
Fritz Steidel

References

External links

Films of the Weimar Republic
German silent feature films
German black-and-white films
Films directed by Felix Basch
1920s German films